Bernd Weidenmann (born January 22, 1945 in Tuttlingen) is an Emeritus Professor of educational psychology Bundeswehr University Munich and author.

Works
 Erfolgreiche Kurse und Seminare  - 2011
 Handbuch Active Training - 2008
 Workshops, Seminare und Besprechungen - 2008
 Die ï¿½berzeugende Prï¿½sentation - 2008
 Pädagogische Psychologie - 2006
 Gesprächs- und Vortragstechnik. Für alle Trainer, Lehrer, Kursleiter und Dozenten - 2002
 100 Tipps & Tricks für Pinnwand und Flipchart - 2000

References

1945 births
Living people
People from Tuttlingen
People from the Free People's State of Württemberg
Academic staff of Bundeswehr University Munich